Service journalism is a term for generally consumer-oriented features and advice, ranging from the serious to the frivolous.

History
Magazines have always striven to inform and entertain.  Modern service journalism was pioneered in part by Clay Felker, who launched New York in 1968.  Published among lengthy investigative and literary pieces were tips and features on fashion, food, and travel.  Service journalism appears in magazines as varied as Maxim and U.S. News & World Report, whose slogan "News You Can Use" aptly defines the term.  Public service journalism is a related term but denotes a different meaning of reporting issues that concern citizens and equipping them to form reasoned opinions on matters of shared interest.

Selected Magazines
 Budget Travel
 Better Homes and Gardens
 Best Products
 Cosmopolitan
 Family Circle
 FHM 
 Fill
 Gear Patrol
 Glamour
 Good Housekeeping
 Health
 Marie Claire
 Men's Fitness
 Maxim
 Ladies' Home Journal
 Men's Health
 More
 Redbook
 Seventeen
 Self
 Shape
 VIVmag
 Women's Health

References

External links
 "5 Reasons to Love Service Journalism", Ryerson Review of Journalism

Types of journalism